The Remington Park Oaks is a Grade III American Thoroughbred horse race for three years old fillies, over a distance of  miles on the dirt held annually in late September at Remington Park in Oklahoma City, Oklahoma.  The event currently carries a purse of $200,000.

History 
The race was inaugurated in 1989 at a distance of 1 mile and 70 yards in mid March.

In 1994 the administration of Remington Park moved the event to the turf and lengthened to the distance of  miles.

The event was not held in 1997 and 2002 and in 1996 and 2004 the event was moved off the turf track onto the main track due to inclement conditions. From 1998 the event was reduced to one mile and in 2005 the event was split into two divisions.
With the introduction of the casino at Remington Park in 2006, stakes increased. The administration in 2009 reverted the race back to dirt at the current distance of  miles and scheduled the race in the fall. 
In 2018 the event was upgraded to a Grade III to be the second event with such a classification at Remington Park.

Records
Speed record: 
  miles – 1:42.03   –  Unbridled Mo (2016)
 1 mile on the turf – 1:34.89  – More Than Promised (2015) 
Margins: 
  lengths – More Than Promised (2015) 
 
Most wins by a jockey  
 6 – Luis S. Quinonez  (1996, 1999, 2001, 2004, 2005, 2006)

Most wins by a trainer
 4 – Steven M. Asmussen (1999, 2005, 2018, 2019)

Most wins by an owner
 2 – Diamond G Ranch (2003, 2004)
 2 – Pin Oak Stable (2006, 2008)
 2 – Brereton C. Jones  (2010, 2015) 
 2 – Exline-Border Racing (2017, 2021)

Winners 

Legend:

See also
List of American and Canadian Graded races

References

Graded stakes races in the United States
Grade 3 stakes races in the United States
1989 establishments in Oklahoma
Flat horse races for three-year-old fillies
Recurring sporting events established in 1989
Sports in Oklahoma City